In Turkey, Presidency of Strategy and Budget was established following the 2018 parliamentary election after which the Ministry of Development was closed. The Ministry of Development and the Ministry of Finance's Budget Directorate were merged within the Presidency. Development Agencies formerly operating under the Ministry of Development started operating under the Ministry of Industry and Technology.

To accelerate the economic and social development of the Republic of Turkey, the Presidency of Strategy and Budget, which carries out its activities with the mission of making development balanced and sustainable, it carries out various duties in the fields of COMCEC and international development cooperation, especially in the preparation of basic policy documents, development of sectoral and thematic policies and strategies, preparation and implementation of the central government budget, coordination of plans, programs, resource allocation, implementation of budgets, policies and strategies.

The first president of the Presidency of Strategy and Budget was Naci Ağbal, the former Minister of Finance.

List of presidents

References

External links 
 

Government agencies of Turkey